Sagoo or Saggu is the 8th-largest clan as well as a surname of Ramgharia people of Punjab. The largest clan is Sidhu-Brar. Like there is one item named sajjan saggu who live in Brampton Its members mainly live in the Punjab region (East Punjab and West Punjab) and also abroad as they migrated overseas. As of 1881 census, there were 135,732 Sandhus.[1][2]

References

Punjabi tribes